Ustur is a mountain in the North Caucasus. It is located in Chegem (Russia). It is 2556 m high.

References 

Mountains of Russia